Jay Wayne Jenkins (born September 28, 1977), known by his stage name Jeezy (or Young Jeezy), is an American rapper. Signing to Def Jam Recordings in 2004, his major label debut, Let's Get It: Thug Motivation 101, was released the following year and debuted at #2 on the Billboard 200, selling 172,000 copies in its first week and receiving platinum certification by the Recording Industry Association of America (RIAA). Jeezy is credited, along with fellow Georgia-based rappers T.I. and Gucci Mane, for helping to pioneer and popularize trap music for a mainstream audience.

Jeezy began his music career in 2001 as Lil J with the release of Thuggin' Under the Influence (T.U.I.). Jeezy since has released ten studio albums which contained numerous successful singles, including the top five hit "Soul Survivor" (featuring Akon), as well as the top 40 hits "I Luv It", "Go Getta" (featuring R. Kelly), and "Put On" (featuring Kanye West). In addition, Jeezy has also been featured on numerous hip hop and R&B hit singles, including "Say I" by Christina Milian, "I'm So Paid" by Akon, "Hard" by Rihanna and "Love in This Club" by Usher, with the latter reaching number one on the US Billboard Hot 100 in 2008.

Outside of his solo career, Jeezy is also the de facto leader of the Southern hip-hop group United Streets Dopeboyz of America (U.S.D.A.) and a former member of the Bad Boy Records' rap group Boyz n da Hood.

Biography

Early life and career beginnings (1977–2004)
Jay Wayne Jenkins was born on September 28, 1977, in Columbia, South Carolina. When he was a toddler, Jenkins relocated to Atlanta, Georgia, where he lived with different family members, as a result of his parents separating. In an interview with XXL magazine, he described his childhood as "empty". At a point in time he lived in Hawkinsville, Georgia, at 600 N Lumpkin. He had lived in Macon, Georgia at an older age, where he befriended many Crip gang members and even affiliated himself with the Crips and started his affiliation with Kinky B who helped his career along with many others.

In 1994, Jeezy spent nine months in YCA (Youth Challenge Academy), a boot camp in Fort Stewart, Georgia, for narcotics possession.  Four years later, in 1998, Jeezy launched the label imprint CTE World, then known as Corporate Thugz Entertainment.

In 2001, under the name Lil J, Young Jeezy released his first independent album, Thuggin' Under the Influence (T.U.I.),. The album included features from artists Freddy J., Kinky B, Fidank, and Lil Jon, who also produced some of the songs. In 2003, Jeezy independently released Come Shop wit Me, a two-CD set featuring new tracks along with some songs previously released on T.U.I. In 2004, Jeezy signed with Bad Boy Records and joined the group Boyz n da Hood, whose self-titled album was released in June 2005 and peaked at #5 on the Billboard 200 album chart.

In May 2004, Jazze Pha's manager, Henry 'Noonie' Lee, showed Jeezy's demo to his friend Shakir Stewart, then Vice President Artist and Repertoire (VP A&R) at Def Jam. Stewart "fell in love with it [the demo] the first time [he] heard it" and took it to L.A. Reid. Reid recognized Jeezy's talent and gave Stewart the green light to sign him.  However,  due to Jeezy's rising popularity, other record labels began pursuing him simultaneously to sign with them, most notably, Warner and Interscope. Ultimately, Jeezy decided he wanted to be in business with Stewart and Reid and signed with Def Jam Records as a result.

Let's Get It: Thug Motivation 101 (2005)
Jeezy released his major label debut, Let's Get It: Thug Motivation 101, on July 26, 2005. The album debuted at #2 on the Billboard 200, selling 172,000 copies in its first week and was later certified Platinum by the RIAA. The debut single off his debut album, "And Then What" featured Mannie Fresh and reached #67 on the Billboard Hot 100. The second single off the album, "Soul Survivor" featuring Akon, reached #4 on the Billboard Hot 100 and would become Jeezy's highest-charting single of his career. The third single, "My Hood", reached #77 on the Billboard Hot 100. In an interview with HitQuarters, A&R Shakir Stewart said that Jeezy had recorded over 60 songs for the album.

In interviews and on several records, Jeezy has affirmed his resistance to commercialism in his music. According to Jeezy, maintaining his street credibility, is of the utmost concern to him as an artist. In 2005, Jeezy was featured in several popular hip hop songs including Gucci Mane's "Icy" and Boyz n da Hood's "Dem Boyz". He would later leave the group after successfully establishing himself as a solo artist.

The Inspiration and U.S.D.A. (2006–2007)

In 2006, Jeezy was featured in Christina Milian's single "Say I". Later that year, on December 12, he released his second major label album, The Inspiration. It topped the Billboard 200 with first-week sales of 352,000 copies and would go on to be certified Platinum by the RIAA. The album's first single, "I Luv It", peaked at #14 on the Billboard Hot 100 and the second single, "Go Getta" featuring R. Kelly, peaked at #18.

Jeezy also extended himself into gaming, portraying himself in the 3D hip-hop fighting game Def Jam: Icon, released in March 2007. Also in 2007, Jeezy's group U.S.D.A (alongside Blood Raw and Slick Pulla) released their debut album, Cold Summer. The album debuted at number 4 on the Billboard 200, selling 95,000 copies in its first week.

On December 17, 2007, Jeezy and CTE started their week-long toy drive and charity event series called the Toyz N Da Hood Drive. The series presented 1,000 toys for 1,000 kids at various locations in Macon and Atlanta. The CTE Christmas Kickoff portion of the event ran from 10 pm to 5 am at Club Miami. The toy giveaway took place in the Unionville neighborhood of Macon and at the Old Fourth Ward Community in Atlanta.

The Recession (2008)
On September 2, 2008, Jeezy released The Recession, his third studio album and, what would be, his second consecutive number one album. It topped the Billboard 200, selling 260,000 copies in its first week and was later certified gold by the RIAA. The album's lead single, "Put On", featured Kanye West and reached #12 on the Billboard Hot 100. The Recession also earned Jeezy a Grammy Award nomination for Best Rap performance by a duo. Other singles off the album included "Vacation", "Crazy World", "My President" featuring Nas, and "Who Dat" featuring Shawty Redd.  Separately, Jeezy made appearances on Usher's  "Love in This Club" and Akon's "I'm So Paid", which was also with Lil Wayne. "Love in This Club" peaked at #1 on the Billboard Hot 100. Later, Jeezy performed on Ciara's single "Never Ever", from her album Fantasy Ride.

In the summer of 2008, Jeezy was at the center of a controversy over his choice for president. While he had previously endorsed Barack Obama, during an interview with Vibe, Jeezy spoke about meeting and supporting John McCain. The statement caused a stir, and Jeezy quickly clarified his stance via a viral video. In the four-minute explanation, Jeezy made it clear that Obama was his main choice. "I represent the Democratic party. ... I've never been nor do I ever plan to be a John McCain supporter", the rapper said. "I support Barack Obama." Jeezy and Jay-Z performed in a concert to celebrate the inauguration of President Obama on January 18, 2009. On The O'Reilly Factor, commentator Bill O'Reilly criticized their performance as a "rant that offended people", but Jeezy responded: "I got white friends. It's nothing like that. I'm a taxpayer, I got a right to voice my opinion at any point in time. I don't think he really understands my struggle."

TM:103 Hustlerz Ambition and Its Tha World (2010–2012)
It was announced in November 2009 that Jeezy started working on Thug Motivation 103. In March 2010, it was reported that Young Jeezy dropped "Young" from his stage name. Later, Young Jeezy denied the name change and claimed it was just a rumor: However, on the cover for his single "Lose My Mind", his name is printed as "Jeezy". "Lose My Mind" peaked at #35 on the Billboard Hot 100.

On March 4, 2010, Jeezy released "Illin", featuring Pusha T of the rap duo Clipse. On the track, Pusha T raps, "No amount of record sales could derail this ...Stuffing dead prezzies in the wall like that Yale bitch..." This line was controversial as many felt the line was in bad taste since it references Yale student Annie Le, who was murdered in 2009. Many felt Young Jeezy and Pusha were making light of Le's tragic death.

Nearly two years after first announcing work on Thug Motivation 103, on May 17, 2011, Jeezy released the first single off the album, "Ballin", which features Lil Wayne and peaked at #57 on the Billboard Hot 100. Two months later, on July 22, the second intended single off the album was released, a track called "Shake Life," although it was later scrapped. On July 26, 2011, Jeezy announced a September 20, 2011 release date for Thug Motivation 103. However the album was pushed back yet again, this time to December 20, 2011. On September 29, 2011, Jeezy released the third single off Thug Motivation 103, named "F.A.M.E." (Fake Ass Motherfuckers Envy), featuring T.I. The song was T.I.'s first appearance on a song since his release from prison. On December 20, 2011, Thug Motivation 103 was finally released. The album debuted at #3 on the Billboard 200, selling 233,000 copies in its first week, becoming certified Gold by the RIAA. "I Do" featuring André 3000 and Jay-Z was the album's fourth single; it peaked at #61 on the Billboard Hot 100. "Leave You Alone" featuring Ne-Yo was the album's fifth single and reached #51 on the Billboard Hot 100. In 2012, Young Jeezy's "I Do" received a Grammy nomination for Best Rap Performance.
 
In October 2012, Jeezy released a new single called "Get Right" on ITunes and sent it to radio. Shortly after the single's release, Jeezy confirmed he had plans to release a new mixtape by the end of 2012 as well as a new album in 2013. On December 12, 2012, Jeezy released It's Tha World, the aforementioned mixtape, hosted by DJ Drama. The mixtape features 2 Chainz, Trey Songz, Lil Boosie, Birdman, YG and E-40. Production came from Jahlil Beats, The Renegades, DJ Mustard, Warren G, Mike WiLL Made It, Cardo and Black Metaphor.

Boss Yo Life Up Gang, Seen It All: The Autobiography and Church in These Streets (2013–2015)

On August 13, 2013, Young Jeezy released a compilation mixtape titled Boss Yo Life Up Gang with CTE World artists, Doughboyz Cashout and YG . The mixtape has two singles, "My Nigga" by YG and "Mob Life" by Doughboyz Cashout, both of which Young Jeezy was featured on. On September 17, 2013, Jeezy premiered the first single "In My Head" produced by Childish Major, from his CTE collaboration mixtape "Its Tha World 2". The following day he announced plans to release his next album, saying it will more deeply detail his street origins. He revealed that Future, Usher, Ludacris, and Don Cannon would be involved in the album.

On May 30, 2014, Jeezy released the first single "Me Ok" from his upcoming fifth studio album Seen It All: The Autobiography. On July 1, 2014, he released the second single, "Seen It All", featuring Jay-Z. On August 31, 2015, Jeezy announced that he would release a new project entitled Church in These Streets. Four singles were released and the project as a whole came on November 13, 2015. It debuted at #4 on the Billboard 200.

Trap or Die 3, Pressure, TM104: The Legend of the Snowman and retirement (2016–2019)
On October 28, 2016, Jeezy released his new album Trap or Die 3, which became available for pre-order on iTunes earlier that month. It debuted at number one on the Billboard 200, becoming Jeezy's third album to top the chart.

On December 15, 2017, Jeezy released his eighth studio album Pressure (originally titled Snow Season).

On August 23, 2019, Jeezy released his ninth album, TM104: The Legend of the Snowman. It was planned to be his final album, as he wanted to venture into acting at the time.

The Recession 2 (2020-present)
On November 20, 2020, Jeezy released his tenth studio album, The Recession 2. As with the original, The Recession, which was released 12 years prior, it is a reflection of the "current times", as Jeezy explained: "It just really inspired me to touch on some of that, but at the same time, motivate my people and give them something to help them through these times and to celebrate, because the shift is happening". The 15-track album features guest appearances from Rick Ross, Ne-Yo, Yo Gotti, E-40, and Demi Lovato, among others. The night before the album's release, Jeezy went live for a Verzuz against Gucci Mane. In addition to the album, he announced a limited series podcast called The (Re)Session Podcast.

Personal life
After Hurricane Katrina, Jeezy opened his house to victims, offering those who had been displaced from their homes a place to call home. 

Jeezy married Jeannie Mai in 2021. The birth of their first child was announced on January 11, 2022. He has three children from previous relationships.

Legal issues
On March 11, 2005, Jeezy was arrested after an alleged shooting with some of his friends in Miami Beach, Florida. He was charged with two counts of carrying a concealed weapon without a permit; however, prosecutors dropped his charges two months later due to lack of evidence.

In Atlanta on June 18, 2008, Young Jeezy was arrested for DUI.

On April 16, 2013, Brian Smith filed a copyright infringement complaint seeking an injunction, damages, and attorney fees against Jay W. Jenkins d/b/a Young Jeezy Music and others in the United States District Court for the Northern District of Georgia, concerning the work "Jizzle"  which was released in July 2010.

On August 27, 2013, Leroy Hutson aka Lee Hutson Sr., former lead singer of 1970s R&B group The Impressions, filed a complaint against Young Jeezy and others alleging that Young Jeezy's song "Time" inappropriately incorporated the instrumental portion of  "Getting it On", which was registered with the United States Copyright Office in 1973.

On January 4, 2014, Jeezy was arrested for battery, false imprisonment, and terrorist threats, after an alleged fight with his son in September 2012.

On August 24, 2014, Jeezy was arrested before performing at the Irvine, California, stop on the Under The Influence Tour in connection with the deadly shooting two days prior in the backstage area,  on another stop of the tour in Mountain View, California. When the police raided Jeezy's tour bus, they found an AK-47 military-style assault rifle and guns on several members of his entourage. In total six people, including Jeezy were arrested, because "no one admitted to owning the assault rifle." His bail was set at one million dollars. On August 26, Jeezy, as well as the five other men he was arrested with, entered not guilty pleas to possession of an illegal assault rifle. Two days later, Jeezy and his associates bonded out. Officers were reportedly told repeatedly that the registered owner of the AK-47 was the tour security chief, who was hospitalized at the time.

Discography

Studio albums
 Let's Get It: Thug Motivation 101 (2005)
 The Inspiration: Thug Motivation 102 (2006)
 The Recession (2008)
 TM103: Hustler'z Ambition (2011)
 Seen It All: The Autobiography (2014)
 Church in These Streets (2015)
 Trap or Die 3 (2016)
 Pressure (2017)
 TM104: The Legend of the Snowman (2019)
 The Recession 2 (2020)

Collaborative albums
 Snofall with DJ Drama (2022)

Filmography
2009: Janky Promoters
2019: I Got the Hook Up 2

Awards
American Music Awards

|-
| rowspan="2"|2007
| Young Jeezy
| Favorite Rap/Hip-Hop Male Artist
| 
|- 
| The Inspiration
| Favorite Rap/Hip-Hop Album
| 
|}

BET Awards

|-
| 2008
| "I'm So Hood (Remix)"
| Best Collaboration
| 
|-
| 2009
| Young Jeezy
| Best Male Hip-Hop Artist
| 
|-
| 2010
| "Hard" (with Rihanna)
| Viewer's Choice
| 
|}
 Note: "I'm So Hood (Remix)" with DJ Khaled, Ludacris, Busta Rhymes, Big Boi, Lil Wayne, Fat Joe, Birdman, & Rick Ross

BET Hip Hop Awards

|-
|rowspan="2"| 2006
| Let's Get It: Thug Motivation 101
| Hip-Hop CD of the Year
| 
|-
| Young Jeezy
| Hip-Hop MVP of the Year
| 
|-
|rowspan="3"| 2008
|rowspan="2"| "I'm So Hood (Remix)"
| Best Hip-Hop Video
| 
|-
| Best Hip-Hop Collaboration
| 
|-
| "Put On" (featuring Kanye West)
| People's Champ Award
| 
|}
 Note: "I'm So Hood (Remix)" with DJ Khaled, Ludacris, Busta Rhymes, Big Boi, Lil Wayne, Fat Joe, Birdman, & Rick Ross

Grammy Award

|-
| 2009
| "Put On" (featuring Kanye West)
| Best Rap Performance by a Duo or Group
| 
|-
| 2010
| "Amazing" (with Kanye West)
| Best Rap Performance by a Duo or Group
| 
|-
| 2011
| "Lose My Mind" (featuring Plies)
| Best Rap Performance by a Duo or Group
| 
|-
| 2013
| "I Do" (featuring Jay-Z and André 3000)
| Best Rap Performance
| 
|}

Ozone Awards

|-
|rowspan="4"| 2007
| The Inspiration
| Best Rap Album
| 
|-
| "Go Getta" (featuring R. Kelly)
| Best Rap/R&B Collaboration
| 
|-
| "Grew Up a Screw Up" (with Ludacris)
| Best Video
| 
|-
| USDA
| Best Group
| 
|-
|rowspan="2"| 2008
| Young Jeezy
| Best Rap Artist
| 
|-
| "Love in This Club" (with Usher)
| Best Rap/R&B Collaboration
| 
|}

References

External links

Official website

 
1977 births
Living people
African-American businesspeople
African-American male rappers
American businesspeople convicted of crimes
American drug traffickers
American music industry executives
American people convicted of drug offenses
Businesspeople from Georgia (U.S. state)
Businesspeople from South Carolina
Def Jam Recordings artists
Gangsta rappers
Musicians from Columbia, South Carolina
Rappers from Atlanta
Rappers from Georgia (U.S. state)
Rappers from South Carolina
Songwriters from Georgia (U.S. state)
Songwriters from South Carolina
Southern hip hop musicians
21st-century American rappers
Crips
Trap musicians
African-American songwriters